The Youngstown  Phantoms are a Tier I junior ice hockey team that plays in the Eastern Conference of the United States Hockey League (USHL). The team plays home games at the 5,200-seat Covelli Centre in Youngstown, Ohio. The team was co-owned by Bruce J. Zoldan (founder and CEO of fireworks brand Phantom Fireworks, hence the team's name) and Troy Loney (who played 12 years in the NHL, primarily for the Pittsburgh Penguins) along with his wife Aafke Loney. In the summer of 2018, the Loney's sold their interests to the Black Bear Sports Group led by CEO Murry Gunty.

History
From their inaugural season in 2003 until 2009, the Phantoms played in the North American Hockey League's North Division, with home games at the 1,000-seat Boardman Ice Zone in the suburb of Boardman, Ohio. From 2005 until 2009, the team was known as the Mahoning Valley Phantoms, because the Central Hockey League's Youngstown SteelHounds moved into the county. However, soon after the SteelHounds shut down, the Phantoms started playing most of their games in the city of Youngstown, and with the move to the USHL, re-adopted the old Youngstown Phantoms name.

Seventeen players with Youngstown Phantoms ties have been drafted into the NHL. Defenseman Scott Mayfield (2009–11) was drafted in the 2nd round, 34th overall pick, by the New York Islanders in the 2011 NHL Entry Draft. Goalie Matthew Mahalak (2009–10) was drafted in the 6th round, 163rd overall pick, by the Carolina Hurricanes also in the 2011 NHL Entry Draft. Forward Nathan Walker (2012–13) was drafted in the 3rd round, 89th overall pick, by the Washington Capitals in the 2014 NHL Entry Draft. Forward Maxim Letunov (2013–15) was drafted in the 2nd round, 52nd overall pick, by the St. Louis Blues also in the 2014 NHL Entry Draft. Also, a total of seven alumni have signed NHL contracts, including Nathan Walker, Scott Mayfield, Brandon Saad, Jiri Sekac, Andrej Sustr, and Lucas Craggs. In addition, Mayfield, Saad, Sustr and Sekac have seen action with their respective NHL clubs, and Saad won the Stanley Cup with the Chicago Blackhawks in 2013.
On August 10, 2011, the Youngstown Phantoms announced 29-year-old Chicago native Anthony Noreen as head coach, making him the third head coach in the team's history. Before joining the Youngstown Phantoms, Noreen was an assistant coach for three seasons at his alma mater, University of Wisconsin - Stevens Point. In April 2012, Noreen's contract was extended through the 2013–14 season. Noreen was hired by the ECHL's Orlando Solar Bears after the 2014–15 season. John Wroblewski was then hired for the 2015–16 season as the fourth head coach in team history. After one season in Youngstown, Wroblewski was hired by the USA Hockey National Team Development Program as the head coach and was replaced by former assistant coach, Brad Patterson.

Regular season records

Playoff records

Roster
As of December 28, 2022.

 

|}

Phantoms drafted into the NHL

2011: Scott Mayfield – 34th overall by New York Islanders
2011: Matt Mahalak – 163rd overall by Carolina Hurricanes
2014: Max Letunov – 52nd overall by St. Louis Blues
2014: Nathan Walker – 89th overall by Washington Capitals
2014: JJ Piccinich – 103rd overall by Toronto Maple Leafs
2015: Kyle Connor – 17th overall by Winnipeg Jets
2015: Chase Pearson – 140th overall by Detroit Red Wings
2015: Ryan Bednard – 206th overall by Florida Panthers
2015: Ryan Shea – 121st overall by Chicago Blackhawks
2015: Steven Ruggiero – 178th overall by Anaheim Ducks
2016: Cam Morrison – 40th overall by Colorado Avalanche
2017: Michael Karow – 126th overall by Arizona Coyotes
2018: Ivan Prosvetov – 114th overall by Arizona Coyotes
2018: Curtis Hall – 119th overall by Boston Bruins
2018: Michael Callahan – 142nd overall by Arizona Coyotes

References

External links 
Official site

United States Hockey League teams
Ice hockey teams in Ohio
Sports in Youngstown, Ohio
Ice hockey clubs established in 2003
2003 establishments in Ohio